Óscar Eduardo Estupiñán Vallesilla (born 29 December 1996) is a Colombian professional footballer who plays as a striker for EFL Championship club Hull City and the Colombia national team.

Club career

Once Caldas
Born in Cali, Estupiñán began his career at Once Caldas. He made his Categoría Primera A debut on 16 May 2015 against Uniautónoma, as a 77th-minute substitute for Sebastián Penco in a 2–2 away draw, and scored his only goal of the season on 26 September in the second minute of a 1–1 home draw with Envigado.

Estupiñán scored 13 goals in 2016, including two on 13 February in a 4–0 home win over Jaguares de Córdoba.

Vitória de Guimarães
On 5 June 2017, Estupiñán became Vitória de Guimarães' first signing of the summer, on an undisclosed contract. He made his debut on 5 August in the Supertaça Cândido de Oliveira, replacing Paolo Hurtado for the final nine minutes of a 3–1 loss to S.L. Benfica at the Estádio Municipal de Aveiro. His first season was split between the first team in the Primeira Liga and the reserves in the second tier; his sole goal of the season for the former was on 5 May 2018 to conclude a 4–1 win at C.D. Tondela, within a minute of leaving the bench.

Having made 14 league appearances and scored once in 18 months at Vitória, Estupiñán returned to South America in January 2019 on loan to Barcelona S.C. in Ecuador. In July that year, he was lent to Denizlispor for the Turkish Süper Lig season.

Upon returning to Vitória, Estupiñán became the starting centre forward ahead of Brazilian Bruno Duarte. In 2021–22, new manager Pepa experimented with playing them in tandem. With 15 goals in 28 games, he finished joint fifth among the league's top scorers.

Hull City
On 13 July 2022, Estupiñán signed a three-year deal with Hull City. He made his debut on 30 July in a 2–1 home win against Bristol City. He opened his account when he scored both goals in the 2–1 home win against Norwich City on 13 August. Two weeks later, Estupiñán scored a hat-trick in a 3–2 home win against Coventry City, his first for the Tigers. On 13 September, Estupiñán was awarded the EFL Championship Player of the Month award for August having scored seven goals across the month.

International career
In June 2022, Estupiñán was called up to the Colombia national team for the first time. The call-up came following his impressive goal return in the 2021–22 Primeira Liga season in which he netted 15 times in 28 appearances ranking as one of the League's top goalscorers.

Career statistics

Honours
Individual
EFL Championship Player of the Month: August 2022

References

1996 births
Living people
Footballers from Cali
Colombian footballers
Association football midfielders
Categoría Primera A players
Primeira Liga players
Liga Portugal 2 players
Campeonato de Portugal (league) players
Ecuadorian Serie A players
Süper Lig players
English Football League players
Once Caldas footballers
Vitória S.C. players
Vitória S.C. B players
Barcelona S.C. footballers
Denizlispor footballers
Hull City A.F.C. players
Colombian expatriate footballers
Expatriate footballers in Portugal
Expatriate footballers in Ecuador
Expatriate footballers in Turkey
Expatriate footballers in England
Colombian expatriate sportspeople in Portugal
Colombian expatriate sportspeople in Ecuador
Colombian expatriate sportspeople in Turkey
Colombian expatriate sportspeople in England